Fante-Anne (Gypsy Anne) is a Norwegian silent film from 1920 directed by Rasmus Breistein. The film is based on a rural story by Kristofer Janson from 1868.

Film history
Fante-Anne is considered to mark the beginning of the national breakthrough in the Norwegian film culture. This was the first Norwegian film to feature professional actors. Unlike previous films made in Norway, Fante-Anne was also made with professionals working at all levels behind the camera. It is also noteworthy as one of the few Norwegian films from this period with Norwegians participating at all levels because Norwegian films were often created by Swedes, Danes, and Germans. Fante-Anne is therefore regarded as the first professional Norwegian feature film.

The film makes use of the Norwegian landscape and rural lifestyle where the action takes place. The film was the first for which the distributor Kommunenes Filmcentral and Norwegian cinema owners were involved in the production. Fante-Anne was also the start of the over three-decade career of Rasmus Breistein, one of the most prominent Norwegian directors of the 20th century.

The film was restored and reissued in 2011, with new music written by Halldor Krogh. Originally, the director Rasmus Breistein himself played the fiddle during screenings of the film.

Plot
Anne, an orphan girl, is raised by the Storlein family on a large farm. After the family's son breaks his promise to live with her and marries another, jealousy causes her to set fire to the farmhouse. Another young man, Jon, is in love with her; he takes the blame for the fire and serves several years of hard labor at Akershus Fortress. After he is released Anne meets him on the road and he persuades Anne and his mother to travel to America together to begin a new life.

Cast
Aasta Nielsen: Anne ("Fante-Anne")
Einar Tveito: Jon Sandbakken, the cottager 
Johanne Bruhn: the farmwife 
Lars Tvinde: Haldor, her son
Dagmar Myhrvold: Anne's mother
Henny Skjønberg: Jon's mother
Kristine Ullmo: Margit Moen, the wealthy farm girl 
Magnus Falkberget: the neighbor boy 
Anders Skrede: the bailiff
Edvard Drabløs: the judge 
Elsa Vang: Anne as a child 
Olaf Solberg: Haldor as a child 
Olav Øygard: the priest

References

External links 
 
 Norsk filmografi: Fante-Anne
 Montages: article with scenes from Fante-Anne

1920 films
Norwegian silent films
Films directed by Rasmus Breistein
Norwegian black-and-white films